Lieutenant-Colonel Sir Evelyn Ridley Bradford, 2nd Baronet (16 April 1869 – 14 September 1914) was a British Army officer and English first-class cricketer. He was killed in action during World War I.

Military career
Bradford was educated at the Royal Military College, Sandhurst and was commissioned into the Seaforth Highlanders as a second lieutenant on 22 August 1888. He was promoted to lieutenant on 11 June 1890, and to captain on 3 July 1895. In 1897 he served in the occupation of Crete. The following year he took part in the Soudan campaign under Sir Herbert Kitchener, where he was present at the Battles of Atbara and Khartoum, for which he was mentioned in despatches and received the Queen's Sudan Medal and the Khedive's Sudan Medal with two clasps. He was next Aide-de-camp to Sir Francis Grenfell, Governor of Malta. In January 1900 he was transferred back as a regular captain in the 2nd battalion of his regiment, and early the following month embarked the SS Canada leaving Southampton for South Africa, where the battalion was to serve in the Second Boer War. He was appointed to the staff as Deputy-Assistant Adjutant-General on 3 January 1902, and received a brevet promotion as major in the South African Honours list published on 26 June 1902, with a note for future staff employment. The war ended that month, and Bradford returned to the United Kingdom on the SS Syria two months later, arriving in Southampton in early September 1902, when he joined the 1st battalion of his regiment.

Bradford was killed in action during the First Battle of the Aisne of the First World War by shrapnel from a shell impact near Bucy-le-Long in Picardy on 14 September 1914, whilst commanding the 2nd Battalion of his regiment. He is buried in Crouy-Vauxrot French National Cemetery.

Cricket career
Bradford was a right-handed batsman who was a right-arm fast bowler. Bradford's playing role was that of an all-rounder.

Bradford made his first-class debut for Hampshire in the 1895 County Championship against Somerset.

During the 1896 County Championship Bradford represented the club three times, taking his maiden five wicket haul against Essex, finishing with figures of 6/28 in Essex's first innings as Essex were bowled out for only 98. Essex were made to follow on in their second innings, with Bradford repeating his feat of taking a five wicket haul in the first innings by taking 5/40 as Hampshire won by an innings and 113 runs.

Bradford next played in 1899 against the touring Australians, where he took the wicket of Frank Iredale, who was his only wicket in the match. Later in 1899 Bradford made his maiden first-class century, scoring 102 against Leicestershire.

Bradford's final first-class match came for Hampshire in 1905 against Surrey, where he made a half century score of 60. In Bradford's eight first-class matches he scored 311 runs at an average of 25.91. With the ball Bradford took 20 wickets at a bowling average of 16.40, with best figures of 6–28. In the field Bradford took five catches.

During his brief career, Bradford's bowling action was not approved by several first-class umpires, being no-balled on numerous occasions.

Family
Bradford's father was Colonel Sir Edward Bradford, 1st Baronet, who was created Baronet of South Audley Street, in the city of Westminster, in the county of London, in 1902. Sir Edward was Commissioner of Police of the Metropolis, head of the London Metropolitan Police, from 1890 to 1903, and upon his father's death in 1911, Bradford succeeded him as 2nd Baronet. Bradford had a son, Edward Bradford who was born in 1910, and who in turn upon his father's death in action in 1914, succeeded as 3rd Baronet at the age of just four. Bradford's maternal grandfather was Edward Knight, who was related to a long line of cricketing families including the Jenners, Normans, Nepeans, Barnards, Bonham Carters, Wathens, and Dykes.

References

External links
Evelyn Bradford at Cricinfo
Evelyn Bradford at CricketArchive

1869 births
1914 deaths
English cricketers
Hampshire cricketers
Baronets in the Baronetage of the United Kingdom
British Army personnel of World War I
British military personnel killed in World War I
Seaforth Highlanders officers
Graduates of the Royal Military College, Sandhurst